The 1995 Ugandan Super League was the 28th season of the official Ugandan football championship, the top-level football league of Uganda.

Overview
The 1995 Uganda Super League was contested by 15 teams and was won by Express FC, while Miracle FC and Nsambya Old Timers were relegated.

League standings

Leading goalscorer
The top goalscorer in the 1995 season was Ibrahim Kizito of Uganda Electricity Board FC with 20 goals.

Footnotes

External links
 Uganda - List of Champions - RSSSF (Hans Schöggl)
 Ugandan Football League Tables - League321.com

Ugandan Super League seasons
1
Uganda
Uganda